Ravicherla is a village in Eluru district of the Indian state of Andhra Pradesh. It is located in Nuzvid mandal of Nuzvid revenue division.

See also 
List of villages in Krishna district

References

Villages in Eluru district